Zafar Kholmurodov (born 15 October 1976), is a retired Uzbek professional footballer and coach.

Career

Nasaf Qarshi
Zafar Kholmurodov played the most time of his career for Nasaf Qarshi, he joined club in 1996. He is the first Uzbek player to score 200 goals in the Uzbek League, in 377 matches (as of 22 May 2012).

Mashal Mubarek
In 2011, he moved to Mash'al Mubarek and scored 9 goals in the 2011 season. On 8 January 2012 he signed a one-year extension contract with club, but moved to Olmaliq FK on free transfer.

Olmaliq FK
On May 25, 2012 in Uzbek League match Olmaliq FK against Metallurg Bekabad, Kholmurodov scored his 200th goal in Uzbek League matches, winning the match with 3:2.

On 29 December 2012 IFFHS published a list of The World's most successful Top Division Goal Scorer among the still active Players. Kholmurodov ranked 19th in this list, scoring in all 200 goals in 379 matches in his career.

Managing career
After the 2012 season, Kholmurodov finished his playing career and started coaching at Nasaf Qarshi.

International
He made his debut in the national team on 18 May 2000 in a match against Thailand. He played 9 matches for the national team.

Honours

Club

 Uzbek League 3rd (5): 2000, 2001, 2005, 2006, 2010
 Uzbek Cup runner-up : 2003

Individual
 Uzbekistan Footballer of the Year  2nd: 2000
 Gennadi Krasnitsky club: 238 goals

References

External links

1976 births
Living people
Uzbekistani footballers
Uzbekistan international footballers
Association football forwards
Uzbekistan Super League players
FC AGMK players
FK Mash'al Mubarek players